Xgraph is the name of at least two applications for 2-D interactive plotting, graphing and animation.

Hein's XGRAPH 

In 1984, Carl Hein of Lockheed Martin Advanced Technology Labs developed XGRAPH. Hein's XGRAPH is available in binary format for various platforms.

Harrison's xgraph 

In 1989, David Harrison of the University of California, Berkeley, released xgraph for X11R3 of X Window. Various versions of Harrison's xgraph are available in source and binary format for various platforms. Harrison's xgraph is released under the BSD License.

References 

  VINT release of xgraph.

X Window programs